Charles Griffin (1825–1867) was a U.S. Army officer and Union general.

Charles or Charlie Griffin may also refer to:
Charles A. Griffin (born 1884), American politician
Charles Griffin (baseball), American baseball player
Charles Griffin (Hudson's Bay Company), person involved in the Pig War 
Charles D. Griffin (1906–1996), U.S. Navy admiral
Charles H. Griffin (1926–1989), U.S. Representative from Mississippi
Charlie Griffin (born 1979), English footballer